Bogdan Adrian Străuț (born 28 April 1986 in Timișoara) is a Romanian defender who plays for CSC Dumbrăvița.

References

External links
 
 

1986 births
Living people
Sportspeople from Timișoara
Romanian footballers
Liga I players
Liga II players
FC CFR Timișoara players
CSM Reșița players
CF Liberty Oradea players
FC Politehnica Timișoara players
FC Politehnica Iași (1945) players
FC Petrolul Ploiești players
FC Brașov (1936) players
CS Minaur Baia Mare (football) players
ACS Poli Timișoara players
FC Ripensia Timișoara players
Association football defenders